Gav Panam (also Romanized as Gāv Panām; also known as Gāv Panāh) is a village in Dorudfaraman Rural District, in the Central District of Kermanshah County, Kermanshah Province, Iran. At the 2006 census, its population was 331, in 83 families.

References 

Populated places in Kermanshah County